In geometry, the truncated triapeirogonal tiling is a uniform tiling of the hyperbolic plane with a Schläfli symbol of tr{∞,3}.

Symmetry

The dual of this tiling represents the fundamental domains of [∞,3], *∞32 symmetry. There are 3 small index subgroup constructed from [∞,3] by mirror removal and alternation. In these images fundamental domains are alternately colored black and white, and mirrors exist on the boundaries between colors.

A special index 4 reflective subgroup, is [(∞,∞,3)], (*∞∞3), and its direct subgroup [(∞,∞,3)]+, (∞∞3), and semidirect subgroup [(∞,∞,3+)], (3*∞). Given [∞,3] with generating mirrors {0,1,2}, then its index 4 subgroup has generators {0,121,212}.

An index 6 subgroup constructed as [∞,3*], becomes [(∞,∞,∞)], (*∞∞∞).

Related polyhedra and tiling 

This tiling can be considered a member of a sequence of uniform patterns with vertex figure (4.6.2p) and Coxeter-Dynkin diagram .  For p < 6, the members of the sequence are omnitruncated polyhedra (zonohedrons), shown below as spherical tilings. For p > 6, they are tilings of the hyperbolic plane, starting with the truncated triheptagonal tiling.

See also

List of uniform planar tilings
Tilings of regular polygons
Uniform tilings in hyperbolic plane

References

 John H. Conway, Heidi Burgiel, Chaim Goodman-Strass, The Symmetries of Things 2008,  (Chapter 19, The Hyperbolic Archimedean Tessellations)

External links 

Apeirogonal tilings
Hyperbolic tilings
Isogonal tilings
Truncated tilings
Uniform tilings